The LSU Tigers football statistical leaders are individual statistical leaders of the LSU Tigers football program in various categories, including passing, rushing, receiving, total offense, defensive stats, and kicking. Within those areas, the lists identify single-game, single-season, and career leaders. The Tigers represent Louisiana State University in the NCAA's Southeastern Conference.

Although LSU began competing in intercollegiate football in 1893, the school's official record book does not generally include full statistics before the 1950s, as records from that period are often inconsistent and incomplete. Records set before then are occasionally included in the lists below if the statistics are available, but they generally are not.

These lists are dominated by more recent players for several reasons:
 Since 1949, seasons have increased from 10 games to 11 and then 12 games in length.
 The NCAA did not allow freshmen to play varsity football until 1972 (with the exception of the World War II years), allowing players to have four-year careers.
 Bowl games only began counting toward single-season and career statistics in 2002. The Tigers have played in a bowl game every year since then, giving recent players an extra game per season to accumulate statistics. Similarly, the Tigers have played in the SEC Championship Game six times since it was first played in 1992. In an extreme example, players in the 2019 season had three extra games to accumulate statistics—the SEC Championship Game, the Peach Bowl (which was a College Football Playoff semifinal), and the College Football Playoff National Championship.
 The Tigers have eclipsed 5,000 total offensive yards in a season 10 times in school history, all of them coming in the 21st century.

These lists are updated through the end of the 2020 season.

Passing

Passing yards

Passing touchdowns

Rushing

Rushing yards

Rushing touchdowns

Receiving

Receptions

Receiving yards

Receiving touchdowns

Total offense
Total offense is the sum of passing and rushing statistics. It does not include receiving or returns.

Total offense yards

Touchdowns responsible for
"Touchdowns responsible for" is the official NCAA term for combined passing and rushing touchdowns.

Defense

Interceptions

Tackles

Sacks

Kicking

Field goals made

Field goal percentage

Footnotes

References

LSU
Statistical Leaders